In the United Kingdom, byelaws are laws of local or limited application made by local councils or other bodies, in specific areas using powers granted by the relevant Acts of Parliament, and so are a form of delegated legislation. Some byelaws are also made by private companies or charities that exercise public or semi-public functions, such as airport operators, water companies or the National Trust.

Formerly, because byelaws created criminal offences that can be prosecuted in magistrates' courts or Justice of the Peace Courts in Scotland, they had to be approved by central government before they came into force. However, due to the Local Government Byelaws (Wales) Act 2012 and the Byelaws (Alternative Procedure) (England) Regulations 2016, there is a simplified procedure for making new byelaws and amending byelaws, including replacing the Secretary of State for Housing, Communities and Local Government’s role in confirming byelaws. This is now a matter for the local council concerned, having taken account of any representations made about a proposed byelaw. The regulations also give councils powers to revoke byelaws under an entirely local process.

Local council byelaws are generally restricted in scope to activities in a particular place, for example a public park, or a particular class of activities, such as amusement arcades. Byelaws are not made for an activity where there is already legislation. Byelaws made by public transport companies are limited to the transport facilities operated by the organisation making the byelaw. Because they only apply to limited areas or facilities, byelaws are generally not made by Statutory Instrument.

Making of local government byelaws 

In 2006, the then Office of the Deputy Prime Minister consulted on changes to how some byelaws are made and approved (confirmed) by central government, and how they are enforced. As a result, the Local Government and Public Involvement in Health Act 2007 included provision for the government to implement alternative arrangements for making byelaws, and for their enforcement through the issue of fixed penalty notices.

A further consultation took place in 2008 concerning the specific byelaws to be affected by the changes, and the new procedures for making byelaws and issuing Penalty Notices.

The 2008 consultation document stated that some byelaws would continue to need to be confirmed by the government. These include those byelaws made by private companies (so as to ensure that there is democratic accountability), and those likely to be controversial, for example concerning fisheries.

The power to issue fixed penalties would be granted to police community support officers and also to suitably trained officers appointed by local councils, including parish councils and community councils.

Following the introduction of the Local Government Byelaws (Wales) Act 2012, and the Byelaws (Alternative Procedure) (England) Regulations 2016, there is a simplified procedure for making new byelaws and amending local government byelaws covered by the Ministry for Housing, Communities and Local Government (MHCLG), including replacing the Secretary of State for Housing, Communities and Local Government’s role in confirming byelaws. This is now a matter for the local council, having taken account of any representations made about the proposed byelaw. The new arrangements transfer the accountability for making byelaws to local councils. Local councils should ensure that a proposed byelaw is proportionate and necessary before making any new byelaw.

Under the new decentralised arrangements, MHCLG will assume information supplied by the local authority in its application for leave to make a byelaw is correct. The Secretary of State will consider the draft byelaws, report and deregulatory statement provided by the local authority and will, within 30 days, either give leave to make the byelaw, or not give leave to make the byelaw. The Secretary of State may also choose to defer his decision to allow time for further consideration. The new arrangements allows the local authority to make only minor modifications to the proposed byelaws after leave has been given to make the byelaws. Councils should therefore ensure care is taken when drafting byelaws. The regulations also give councils powers to revoke byelaws under an entirely local process.

Enforcement of byelaws 
Breaches of byelaws are prosecuted in a magistrates' court or Justice of the Peace Courts in Scotland. The punishment is a fine, the maximum being generally between £500 and £2,500.

Local council byelaws 

Local councils have powers to make byelaws under various Acts of Parliament. The power to make byelaws "for the good rule and government" of their area, granted by the Local Government Act 1972, appears to be very sweeping, however this power is greatly limited by the restriction that it cannot be used in connection with anything already covered under other legislation.

Other Acts grant powers to make byelaws relating to various aspects of public recreation, the management of markets, ensuring hygiene in certain types of business and behaviour in public libraries.

Following the election of the Conservative–Liberal Democrat Coalition Government in 2010, it has been suggested that councils may be permitted to use byelaws to improve public health, by imposing local minimum prices for alcohol, limiting promotions associated with fast food or making films depicting smoking automatically 18 rated. In Wales, local council byelaws do not need to be confirmed by central government since the Local Government Byelaws (Wales) Act 2012.

Countryside byelaws 

Byelaws concerning the behaviour of the public in the countryside are limited to defined areas, and might be made by a local council, a national park authority, or other bodies established by statute specifically to look after a particular area.

Transport byelaws 

A variety of Acts grant powers to make byelaws regulating conduct on public transport. The power to make byelaws is usually granted to the public transport operator, which is sometimes a private company.

Military lands byelaws 

The Secretary of State for Defence has powers under section 14 of the Military Lands Act 1892 to make byelaws regulating access to Ministry of Defence lands, including their use by the public for recreation. Since 2004, the Ministry of Defence is reviewing all of its byelaws. Unlike most other byelaws, military lands byelaws are made by Statutory Instrument.

Notes 

United Kingdom administrative law